Vester was a musical instrument brand specialised in guitars and amplifiers. Formed as a part of retail company "Samuel Music" based in Effingham, Illinois, Vester is perhaps best known for their good quality Korean electric and acoustic guitars.

History 

The Samuel Music Company, founded in 1946, was the proprietor and owner of a chain of music stores which sold pianos and specialized in school band renting programs. Following the success of several small luthier businesses such as Jackson and ESP in the late 1980s boom of the rock music industry, the Samuel Music company decided to launch its own brand of guitars, and named the brand "Vester".

Rather than manufacture the instruments themselves, Vester used imported instruments, starting with Young Chang during 1987-88, then Saehan Guitar Technology, a subdivision of Zaozhuang Saehan Music Co., Ltd in South Korea (now known as Sunghan Music). The guitars were imported into the United States by Midco Music (now Musicorp), at the time chaired by L.Dean Samuel. Design specifications were dictated by Samuel Music in Illinois and revolved around variations on Saehan's preexisting top-of-the-line models.

For a brief period in 1992, Vester manufactured an electric twelve-string model with dual humbucking pickups, a disparate string aperture of 6-bridge-through and 6-body-through access points, and two separately mounted volume and tone controls. This Vester model is the only known configuration of dual humbucking pickups on a solid body electric 12-string guitar. The model was initially inspired by a line of 135 candy-apple red guitar bodies produced in imitation of Ibanez and Kramer Stratocasters of the late 1980s to attract a younger segment of the market -- hoping to capitalize on Vester's small foothold among secondary school supply-and-requirements contracts at the time. Approximately half-way through that production, the bodies were retro-fitted with six extra string-through access points and six extra tuning heads to turn the model into a 12-string electric guitar.

Eventually, Vester guitars managed to find a good home in the marketplace and covered a broad range of Korean made middle-to upper-range acoustic and electric guitars, along with basic solid state amplifier models. Through contacts in the music industry Vester was able to secure endorsements from several popular musicians of the period, including the Country and Western band Alabama.

In 2013, Vester closed its music departments in Effingham, although the company continued with teaching lessons.

References

Guitar manufacturing companies of the United States